In the Chicago mayoral election of 1867, incumbent Republican John Blake Rice won reelection, defeating Democrat Francis Cornwall Sherman by a nearly twenty-point margin.

The election was held on April 16. It was ultimately a rematch of the previous election. This was Chicago's first mayoral election held after the conclusion of the American Civil War.

This was the final election before a law that would move mayoral elections from April to November.

Results

References

Mayoral elections in Chicago
Chicago
Chicago
1860s in Chicago